ArenaBowl XXXII was the 32nd and final ArenaBowl and the championship game of the 2019 Arena Football League season. The game took place on August 11, 2019, with kickoff at 8:00 p.m. EDT on ESPN2. It featured the winners of the two semifinals, the No. 1 seed Albany Empire and the No. 3 seed Philadelphia Soul.

AFL Commissioner Randall Boe also confirmed that the league's expansion plans for next season would be unveiled during the game; however, these plans were pushed back to several weeks after the game after Boe said that negotiations for the two new teams would not be finished in time. The league ultimately filed for Chapter 7 bankruptcy on November 27 of that year, making the game the final one in the league's history.

Venue
As the higher seed, the No. 1 Albany Empire hosted ArenaBowl XXXII at the Times Union Center.

2019 playoffs

Teams

Albany Empire

The Empire, led by head coach Rob Keefe, finished the regular season 10–2 and earned the No. 1 seed for the second straight season. They defeated No. 4 Baltimore home and away in the semifinal to advance to their first ArenaBowl.

Philadelphia Soul

The Soul, led by head coach Clint Dolezel, finished the regular season 7–5 and earned the No. 3 seed for the second straight season. They defeated No. 2 Washington home and away in the semifinal to advance to their sixth ArenaBowl; they are 3–2 in previous appearances.

Series record
The all-time series between the Empire and the Soul dates back to the Empire's inaugural game on April 14, 2018. Entering the game, Albany led the series 4–3.

Game summary

References

External links
 Official Website

032
2019 Arena Football League season
2019 in American television
August 2019 sports events in the United States
2019 in sports in New York (state)
Events in Albany, New York